Scrobipalpa peterseni is a moth in the family Gelechiidae. It was described by Povolný in 1965. It is found in Algeria, Tunisia, on Sicily and in Saudi Arabia.

The forewing margins are whitish brown to brown. The hindwings are dirty whitish.

References

Scrobipalpa
Moths described in 1965